Kamal Al-Haddad is a Canadian electrical engineer, currently a Canada Research Chair at Université de Montréal.

References

Year of birth missing (living people)
Living people
Academic staff of the Université de Montréal
Canadian electrical engineers